Carlos Manuel Contreras (born January 8, 1991) is a Dominican professional baseball pitcher.
played in Major League Baseball (MLB) for the Cincinnati Reds in 2014 and 2015.

Professional career

Cincinnati Reds
The Cincinnati Reds added Contreras to their 40-man roster after the 2012 season. He was named to appear in the 2013 All Star Futures Game.

Contreras was called up to the Reds from the Double-A Pensacola Blue Wahoos on June 21, 2014, and made his debut the same day against the Toronto Blue Jays in the ninth inning.  In nine pitches he retired the side and recorded his first major league strikeout. Contreras was released by the Reds on March 15, 2016.

Later career
On April 20, 2017, Contreras signed with the Laredo Lemurs of the American Association of Independent Professional Baseball. When the Lemurs folded before the season started he signed on with the Texas AirHogs.

On June 28, 2017, Contreras left the AirHogs to sign with the Vaqueros Unión Laguna of the Mexican Baseball League. He was released on February 1, 2018. 

On June 17, 2018, Contreras signed with the AirHogs. He was released on May 15, 2019. Contreras later re-signed with the AirHogs on August 1, 2019. In 2020, the team was not selected by the league to compete in the condensed season due to the COVID-19 pandemic. Contreras was not chosen by another team in the dispersal draft, and therefore became a free agent.

On February 18, 2022, Contreras was signed by Parma Baseball.

References

External links

1991 births
Living people
Arizona League Reds players
Bakersfield Blaze players
Billings Mustangs players
Caribes de Anzoátegui players
Cincinnati Reds players
Criollos de Caguas players
Dominican Republic expatriate baseball players in Puerto Rico
Dayton Dragons players
Dominican Republic expatriate baseball players in Mexico
Dominican Republic expatriate baseball players in the United States
Dominican Summer League Reds players
Leones del Escogido players
Louisville Bats players
Major League Baseball pitchers
Major League Baseball players from the Dominican Republic
Mexican League baseball pitchers
Pensacola Blue Wahoos players
Sportspeople from Santo Domingo
Texas AirHogs players
Toros del Este players
Vaqueros Unión Laguna players
Dominican Republic expatriate baseball players in Venezuela
Dominican Republic expatriate baseball players in Nicaragua